Senator Morton may refer to:

Members of the United States Senate
Jackson Morton (1794–1874), U.S. Senator from Florida from 1849 to 1855
Oliver P. Morton (1823–1877), U.S. Senator from Indiana from 1867 to 1877
Thruston Ballard Morton (1907–1982), U.S. Senator from Kentucky from 1957 to 1968

United States state senate members
Bob Morton (politician) (1934–2015), Washington State Senate
Earl D. Morton (1918–1995), Wisconsin State Senate
Harry K. Morton (1905–1994), New York State Senate

See also
Morton (surname)